is a Japanese retired high jumper.

He finished seventh at the 2009 Asian Championships, fifth at the 2009 Summer Universiade, won the silver medal the 2010 Asian Games and finished fourth at the 2013 Asian Championships.

His personal best is 2.28 metres, achieved in May 2015 in Kawasaki.

He retired in November 2020.

Personal bests

International competition

National titles
Japanese Championships
High jump: 2010, 2012, 2013

References

External links

Hiromi Takahari at JAAF 

1987 births
Living people
Sportspeople from Kanagawa Prefecture
Japanese male high jumpers
Asian Games silver medalists for Japan
Asian Games medalists in athletics (track and field)
Athletes (track and field) at the 2010 Asian Games
Medalists at the 2010 Asian Games
Competitors at the 2009 Summer Universiade
Japan Championships in Athletics winners
Tokai University alumni